Leucochloridium is a genus of parasitic trematode worms in the order Diplostomida. It Is the sole genus in the family Leucochloridiidae. Members of this genus cause pulsating swellings in the eye-stalks of snails (a phenomenon colloquially called a zombie snail), so as to attract the attention of predatory birds required in the parasites' lifecycle.

Taxonomy

Species

Species in the genus Leucochloridium include:

 Leucochloridium caryocatactis (Zeder, 1800) now in genus Urogonimus
 Leucochloridium fuscostriatum Robinson, 1948 synonymised with L. variae
 Leucochloridium holostomum (Rudolphi, 1819)
 Leucochloridium paradoxum Carus, 1835
 Leucochloridium perturbatum Pojmanska, 1969 synonymised with L. variae
 Leucochloridium phragmitophila Bykhovskaja-Pavlovskja & Dubinina, 1951
 Leucochloridium variae McIntosh, 1932
 Leucochloridium vogtianum Baudon, 1881

Synonyms
 Leucochloridium macrostomum is a synonym for Urogonimus macrostomus (Rudolphi, 1802)

See also
 Aggressive mimicry

References

External links
 
 

Diplostomida
Digenea genera
Suicide-inducing parasitism
Articles containing video clips